The Preceptor Stinger is an American homebuilt aircraft that was designed and produced by Preceptor Aircraft of Rutherfordton, North Carolina. When it was available the aircraft was supplied as plans or as a kit for amateur construction.

The company appears to have gone out of business in 2012 and production curtailed.

Design and development
The Stinger is a development of the Preceptor N3 Pup. It features a strut-braced parasol wing, a single-seat, open cockpit, fixed conventional landing gear and a single engine in tractor configuration.

The aircraft is made from welded steel tubing covered in doped aircraft fabric. The wing is supported by cabane struts and "V" struts, with jury struts.

The manufacturer estimated the construction time from the supplied kit as 450 hours and the cost to complete the aircraft at US$22,000-26,000 in 2011.

Operational history
By 1998 the company reported that three kits had been sold and one aircraft had been completed and was flying. By 2011 the company reported that two were flying.

Specifications (Stinger)

References

External links
Photo of a Stinger

Stinger
1990s United States sport aircraft
1990s United States ultralight aircraft
Single-engined tractor aircraft
Parasol-wing aircraft
Homebuilt aircraft